Norman John Rowe  (born 1 February 1947) is an Australian singer and songwriter. He rose to national prominence in the mid-1960s as a pop star and teen idol, backed by The Playboys. His 1965 double A-side "Que Sera Sera"/"Shakin' All Over" was one of the most successful Australian singles of the decade. 

Born in Melbourne, Rowe was inspired by rock and roll as a teenager and began performing while still in high school, leaving his job to become a professional entertainer. He was signed by local label Sunshine, where he released his biggest hits. He was credited for his bright and edgy tenor voice and dynamic stage presence, and was named "King Of Pop" by Go-Set in 1967 and 1968. Many of his most successful recordings were produced by Nat Kipner and later by Pat Aulton, house producers for the Sunshine label. Rowe's string of consecutive top ten singles in the mid-1960s made him the most popular solo performer of the era, although attempts to break into the United Kingdom were unsuccessful.

Rowe was drafted for National Service in late 1967, with his subsequent tour of duty in Vietnam, which lasted from 1968 to 1970, effectively ending his pop career, with the anti-war movement and stigma toward returning soldiers negatively affecting his reputation. Unable to recapture the musical success he enjoyed at his peak in the 1960s, he pursued a career in theatre and television, including a role on Seven Network soap opera Sons and Daughters. In 1991, he was involved in a physical fight on live television with Ron Casey after the latter made remarks about Rowe's service in Vietnam.

Biography

Early life: 1947–1964
Rowe was born and raised in Northcote in Melbourne, Victoria, Australia. He was drawn to music early in life. He began singing with his local church choir in Melbourne while at primary school. He was hooked on rock and roll music even before his teens and Col Joye became one of his early idols and inspirations. He took up guitar and formed his first amateur band, The Valiants, whilst attending Northcote High School. They performed once a month at Alphington Methodist Hall. He concentrated on singing and made his first stage appearance as a lead vocalist in a music school concert, aged 14.

By luck, the show was compered by top Melbourne radio DJ Stan Rofe. Rofe was impressed by Rowe's talent and arranged for him to work with local dance promoter Kevin McClellan. He began performing regularly at Melbourne dances and discos, backed by instrumental groups like The Thunderbirds, The Impostors and finally The Playboys, who became his permanent band until 1967.

After leaving high school at the end of 1962, Rowe had joined the Postmaster-General's Department (PMG) on 14 January 1963 (later split in 1975 into Telecom Australia and Australia Post). He worked as a trainee technician, but in late 1964 his long hair became an issue with his employers and, in the face of a "cut it or quit" ultimatum, he left the PMG to become a professional entertainer. Working on the Melbourne dance circuit, he became a popular attraction and it was not long before he was picked to become a regular on Melbourne pop TV shows like Teen Scene and The Go!! Show. According to music historian Ed Nimmervoll, EMI apparently had the chance to sign him but turned him down, claiming that he could not sing. He was signed to a recording deal with the independent label Sunshine which included a management deal with the Ivan Dayman organisation.

Music career

Sixties stardom
Rowe's first single, released in April 1965, was a brooding "beat" arrangement of George Gershwin's "It Ain't Necessarily So" (from Porgy & Bess) a choice suggested by Stan Rofe. It was a Number 1 hit in Melbourne and a Top Ten hit in most other capitals cities (No. 6 in Sydney, No. 5 in Adelaide, No. 3 in Brisbane), even though Sydney pop station 2SM (then owned by the Catholic Church) banned it because of its supposedly sacrilegious lyrics. The inspiration for Rowe's version was apparently a 1963 version by the United Kingdom band Ian and the Zodiacs. Some references cite the source as a version by The Merseybeats, but that band never recorded "It Ain't Necessarily So". The name of the Ian & The Zodiacs' album This Is Merseybeat has apparently been confused with the name of the band The Merseybeats.

Rowe's first LP was released in July 1965. His second single (also apparently discovered while trawling through Rofe's vast record collection), released in August, was a cover of Ben E. King's "I (Who Have Nothing)". It became his second Top 10 hit (No. 10 in Sydney, No. 6 in Adelaide, No. 4 in Melbourne) (and a Number 23 in Brisbane).

Although Rowe's third single, "I Confess" / "Everything's Alright", was apparently withdrawn before or soon after release, the next single became the biggest hit of his career. The A-side was a cover of "Que Sera Sera" (best known from the Doris Day original), which was given a "Merseybeat" treatment (in the manner of The Beatles' "Twist & Shout"). Paired with a powerful version of the Johnny Kidd & The Pirates' classic "Shakin' All Over", the single became a double-sided No. 1 hit in most capitals (#1 Sydney, #1 Melbourne, #1 Brisbane, #1 Adelaide) in September, charting for 28 weeks and selling in unprecedented numbers—rock historian Ian McFarlane reports sales of 80,000 copies while 1970s encyclopedist Noel McGrath claimed sales of 100,000, and it is reputed to be the biggest-selling Australian single of the 1960s. Normie scored another first in October by having three hit singles in the Melbourne Top 40 simultaneously.

An oft-repeated story that the whistle used in the arrangement was an innovation by the record's producer appears to be unfounded because very similar arrangements, complete with whistle, had been recorded on earlier versions by Earl Royce & The Olympics (UK, 1964) and by The High Keys (USA, 1963).

Rowe's success continued through late 1965 and into the first half of 1966, during which time he scored another three consecutive Top Ten singles. "Tell Him I'm Not Home" (Nov. 1965) – a cover of a song originally recorded by Chuck Jackson in 1963—was a Top 5 hit in most mainland capitals, reaching #4 in Sydney, #2 in Melbourne, #2 in Adelaide and #1 in Melbourne It was followed by his version of Burt Bacharach and Hal David's "The Breaking Point" (b/w "Ya Ya", Feb. '66) which became his second double-sided hit, a number #1 in Brisbane and making the Top Ten in all mainland capitals, peaking at #9 in Adelaide, #8 in Sydney, #2 in Melbourne and Perth, #1 in Brisbane

"Pride & Joy" (June 1966) was also Top Ten in most state capitals. This single is also notable for its B-side, a cover of "The Stones That I Throw", written by Robbie Robertson, a song originally recorded in 1965 by Levon & the Hawks, later known as The Band. He appeared in the 1966 musical comedy film Don't Let It Get You. Mid-year he joined The Easybeats, Bobby & Laurie and MPD Ltd on "The Big Four" national tour that played to huge crowds around the country.

United Kingdom: 1966–1968
Rowe was by this time the most popular solo performer in Australia, so in August 1966 he left to try his luck in the UK. In preparation, he revamped the line-up his backing band "the Playboys". Several members opted to stay in Australia for family reasons, so Rowe replaced them with bassist Brian Peacock and guitarist Rod Stone, both from the ex-New Zealand band The Librettos, which had recently split.

Arriving in London ahead of his band, Rowe engaged one Ritchie Yorke as his London agent and began to record with producers Trevor Kennedy and John Carter, using the cream of London's session musicians, including Big Jim Sullivan, Jimmy Page, John Paul Jones, famed drummer Clem Cattini, and vocal group The Breakaways. The sessions produced several strong new recordings including "Ooh La La", "It's Not Easy", "Mary Mary", "Turn on the Love Light" and "Can't Do Without Your Love". Despite his absence in London, Rowe's run of chart success in Australia continued—his next single, "Ooh La La" / "Ain't Nobody Home" (Nov. 1966) was another double-sided hit in Melbourne and a Top 5 hit in most capitals, reaching #2 in Sydney, and #4 in Brisbane and Adelaide.

Up to this time there was no national pop chart in Australia, with most pop radio stations and newspapers in state capitals and major cities publishing their own competing charts. However, on 5 October 1966 Go-Set magazine, which had been launched in February, began publishing its first weekly national Top 40, compiled by Ed Nimmervoll. "Ooh La La" / "Mary, Mary" debuted at #6 on the new Go-Set chart on 7 December 1966, and reached #1 in the 21 December chart, hence becoming Rowe's first official national #1 hit. It stayed at #1 for two weeks before being briefly supplanted by The Easybeats' "Friday on My Mind" on 4 January, but returned to the top for the next two weeks.

While "Ooh La La" was at #1 in Australia, Rowe's next single, the ballad "It's Not Easy" was also climbing the chart. It debuted at #17 in the Go-Set chart in the last week of December 1966, and reached the Top 10 in the second week of January. Through the end of January and into February, Rowe achieved a 'first' for an Australian popular recording artist by having two of the top three singles simultaneously for three consecutive weeks. Rowe worked in England for ten months and toured with acts including Julie Driscoll, Brian Auger & The Trinity, The Spencer Davis Group, Kiki Dee, Gene Pitney and The Troggs. High hopes were held for a British breakthrough, and in the early months of 1967 the pages of Go-Set featured predictions of his imminent UK stardom, though it never materialised.

The new Playboys lineup arrived in London in December; Normie flew home for Christmas, which coincided with the release of "It's Not Easy" / "Mary Mary", and he returned to England in January. In March 1967 the group embarked on a tour of the UK supporting The Troggs, Gene Pitney and Sounds Incorporated. The same month, Phil Blackmore left the group for family reasons and returned to Australia; he was replaced by English organist Trevor Griffin. Rod Stone left in mid-1967 (returning to Australia, after which he joined band The Groove) and he was replaced by former Adam Faith sideman Mick Rogers. At the end of 1966, Normie Rowe was voted Australia's best male singer in the inaugural Go-Set Pop Poll.

Meanwhile, The Playboys secured a one-off single deal with Andrew Loog Oldham's Immediate Records label, releasing the single "Sad" / "Black Sheep RIP" in August. Written by Brian Peacock, "Sad" is now considered a 'freakbeat' classic and has been widely anthologised, appearing on the British collection Chocolate Soup For Diabetics Vol III, Raven Records' Kicks and Rhino's Nuggets II. In June, Normie Rowe & The Playboys travelled to North America, supporting Roy Orbison on a US tour, and along with The Seekers he represented Australia in performance at Expo '67 in Montreal. He returned to Australia in July, where he appeared as a special guest at the national finals of the 1967 Hoadley's Battle of the Sounds.

Rowe had more national chart success in late 1967 with the Graham Gouldman song "Going Home" (b/w "I Don't Care") – assumed to be about the Vietnam War, but really about a migrant's return to Australia from Britain—which debuted at #22 in the Go-Set chart in late April and stayed in the national Top Ten until the end of May, peaking at #7 in the second week of May. "Sunshine Secret" / "But I Know", and another single, "Turn Down Day" charted in Melbourne. But in September 1967 any questions about his career future were dramatically stalled when he received his call-up notice for national service. Interviewed by the media, Row

National Service: 1968–1970

Rowe was inducted into the army in February 1968, although he continued to perform part-time (albeit with a regulation short-back-and-sides army style haircut). At least one TV appearance has survived of Normie with the army "do", performing "It's Not Easy" and "Penelope" on the 19 October edition of music program Uptight. He also began working with a new backing band, Nature's Own, who also regularly backed Johnny Farnham and other members of the Sunshine roster. His only charting record during this period was the ballad "Penelope", written by former Playboys member Brian Peacock.

Every move of Rowe's basic training at Puckapunyal took place in the full glare of the media spotlight. He was shipped off to Vietnam in January 1969, and he served his tour of duty there with distinction, rising to the rank of Corporal and was Crew Commander of an armoured personnel carrier. He was discharged from the army in February 1970. His Vietnam experiences left a deep impression on him, and since that time he has worked extensively on behalf of other Vietnam veterans.

Rowe had one last minor hit in May 1970 with the song "Hello", written by Johnny Young, and he released an album of the same name. (It was revealed many years later that Young's song "Smiley", a major hit for Ronnie Burns in 1969, was written about Normie). The Hello album marked the end of his Sunshine contract, although the label had been taken over by Festival several years earlier after it got into financial problems. Normie signed to Festival in 1971, for whom he cut three singles. "Que Sera Sera" was re-released in January 1971 and on 6 March he married his girlfriend Sue Powlesland.

Unfortunately, his national service stint had effectively ended his pop career, and Normie was never able to recover the momentum and mass popularity he lost because of being conscripted. In his absence, Ronnie Burns and John Farnham (then billed as Johnny Farnham) had taken over and Farnham was now the new King of Pop. The strong anti-war sentiment of the period affected him, and like many Vietnam vets, Normie suffered considerably because of his service. Normie has said that he was treated like a pariah by the very people who had been buying his records and screaming at his concerts only a couple of years before. One of the people Normie remembers fondly from this period, who stuck by him and gave him encouragement in tough times, was Meteors drummer Stewie Speer. Normie remembers that Stewie would often wear "King Normie" and "We Love Normie" badges on his jacket.

Variety
Although his pop career was now effectively over, Rowe was able to fall back on the training from his dance hall days and he began to concentrate on a varied career playing the club and hotel circuit as well as making TV performances, where he became a popular attraction on variety programs like The Don Lane Show and The Mike Walsh Show. He continued to record through the 1970s, 1980s and 1990s. He switched to the Astor Records label in 1975 and had considerable success with the single "Elisabeth", which won the "Best Song" category at that year's Tokyo Music Festival.

Theatre and television
In the 1980s Rowe began to expand his career into acting and musical theatre. He studied at the Sydney's famous Ensemble Theatre and took roles on stage and TV, including an extended role in the TV soapie Sons & Daughters. In 1987 he won great acclaim in his central role of Jean Valjean in Cameron Mackintosh's Sydney production of the musical Les Misérables.

Among other musical roles in the 1980s and 1990s, Rowe played the lead role on the recording, and in the world premiere concerts of a new Australian musical, Cyrano de Bergerac, which he helped develop, played Daddy Warbucks in Annie, Freddy Trumper (the American) in Chess, and Juan Perón in Evita. One of the highlights of his career was his appointment as a Member of the Order of Australia (AM) for services to Vietnam veterans, the entertainment industry and the community. Normie has had a long association with many charity and community groups, with his major concern being the welfare of children. He is a long-serving member of Variety Clubs of Australia, for which he is now a National Ambassador, and he has won several awards for his work with them, including 1996's 'Heart and Soul of Variety' award.

Rowe remained a popular attraction at clubs, corporate functions and on the "rock-&-roll revival" circuit in the 1990s. He also kept up regular appearances on TV variety shows. This led to one infamous incident in 1991 that briefly took him back into the headlines. During a forum on republicanism on the Midday Show with Ray Martin he was involved in an on-air melée with Sydney journalist and talkback-radio host Ron Casey. Notorious for his highly controversial comments on immigration and other issues, Casey enraged Normie with his remarks about his service in Vietnam and Normie confronted Casey by shoving him. Casey flew out of his chair and punched Rowe hard enough to knock Rowe backwards. In 1998, Casey and Rowe re-united, filming a TV commercial for Bushell's tea where the Midday incident was reflected upon.

Personal life
Rowe has also had to endure other public hardships, including family problems involving his teenage daughter, which resulted in a great deal of intrusive and unwelcome publicity and the end of his marriage to his first wife, Sue. In October 1979 Normie's son, Adam John Rowe, died after being accidentally knocked down by a motorist while he was riding his bicycle home from his school fete when he was 8 years old. Unknown to many, Normie also has another son who was born in November 1965 in Melbourne who has remained anonymous to this day.

2002–current
In 2002, Rowe received national acclaim for his performance in the Long Way to the Top concert tour, Rowe's most recent album, Missing in Action, includes his own version of Ronnie Burns hit "Smiley".

Rowe portrayed former Prime Minister, Harold Holt, in the telemovie The Prime Minister is Missing, which was first broadcast on ABC TV on 23 October 2008.

In 2009 Rowe participated in a video interview that is on display in "The Shrine of Memories World War II memorial" in ANZAC Square, Brisbane as part of an installation art titled Enshrining the Vestiges – Speaking Stones by artist Natalie Billing. In October 2010, Rowe's 1965 album, Ain't Necessarily So, was listed in the book, 100 Best Australian Albums.

Normie Rowe was one of the lead acts in the reunion of the 'Go Show' concerts held in Melbourne and Adelaide during Feb 2011.

In 2011 (2 April) Rowe was a guest on episode 115 of SBS show RocKwiz where he performed Shakin' All Over and a duet with Georgia Fields of The Beatles song All I've Got to Do.

In January 2012, Normie appeared in a television advertisement for Coles Supermarkets promoting their products to the reworked tune of "Shakin All Over".

In 2015, he told Noise11.com about his being drafted as a political ruse to help the popularity of Harold Holt, the Australian Prime Minister whose death by drowning in December 1967 was never confirmed. Apparently, he was contacted by the son of a military officer who was at the time the military attache to Prime Minister Harold Holt.  The officer told this story just before he died to his son who, in turn, told Normie that his dad was in Harold Holt's office when the PM was struggling with popularity and the anti-war movement. So the officer said to Harold Holt "what you need is an Elvis Presley, so get Normie Rowe called up"..

In June 2017, Normie wrapped filming for a short film titled 'Holt' in June 2017 where he, ironically, 
played the titular Harold Holt for the third time. Filming took place in Queensland around Brisbane and the Sunshine Coast.

Charity
In 2009, Rowe became a Patron of Kidney Health Australia, the not-for-profit peak body promoting good kidney health through education, advocacy, research and support.

Discography

Albums
 1965 – It Ain't Necessarily So, But It Is Normie Rowe (Sunshine released July 1965 QL 31734/Calendar re-release late 1965 R 66–73)
 1965 – Normie Rowe a Go Go (Sunshine QL 31802)
 1965 – A Wonderful Feeling (Sunshine QL 31871/Calendar R66-335)
 1966 – Normie's Hit Happenings (Sunshine QL 32198/Calendar R66-553)
 1966 – So Much Love From Normie Rowe (Sunshine QL 32144)
 1968 – Everything's Alright (Universal UP 768) (Compilation of Rowe's first two LPs)
 1969 – Normie's Top Tunes (Universal)
 1973 – Hello (Sunshine L 25093)
 1974 – Out of the Norm
 1970 – Normie Rowe's Greatest Hits (Harlequin L 25138)
 2007 –   Missing in Action
 1974 – Come Hear My Song (Summit SRA 250152)
 1975 – Normie's Hit Tunes (Summit SRA 249 9020)
 2000 – The Early Anthology (Festival D46111) Double CD

EPs

Singles

Awards and nominations

ARIA Music Awards
The ARIA Music Awards is an annual awards ceremony that recognises excellence, innovation, and achievement across all genres of Australian music. They commenced in 1987. Rowe was inducted into the Hall of Fame in 2005.

|-
| ARIA Music Awards of 2005
| himself
| ARIA Hall of Fame
|

Go-Set Pop Poll
The Go-Set Pop Poll was coordinated by teen-oriented pop music newspaper, Go-Set and was established in February 1966 and conducted an annual poll during 1966 to 1972 of its readers to determine the most popular personalities.

|-
| rowspan="2"| 1966
| rowspan="2"| himself
| Australian Acts: Male Vocal
| style="background:gold;"| 1st
|-
| International Acts: Male Vocal
| style="background:silver;"| 2nd
|-
| rowspan="2"| 1967
| rowspan="2"| himself
| Australian Acts: Male Singer
| style="background:silver;"| 2nd
|-
| International Acts: Male Singer
| style="background:tan;"| 3rd
|-
| 1968
| himself
| Australian Acts: Top Male Singer
| style="background:gold;"| 1st
|-
| 1969
| himself
| Australian Acts: Top Male Singer
| 4th
|-
| 1970
| himself
| Australian Acts: Top Male Singer
| 5th
|-

King of Pop Awards
The King of Pop Awards were voted by the readers of TV Week. The King of Pop award started in 1967 and ran through to 1978.

|-
| 1967
| himself
| King of Pop
| 
|-
| 1968
| himself
| King of Pop
| 
|-

References

Biographical references:
Ian McFarlane: Australian Encyclopedia of Rock & Pop (Allen & Unwin, 1999)
Noel McGrath: Australian Encyclopedia of Rock (Outback Press, 1978)
Ed Nimmervoll: "Normie Rowe" archived from the original on 27 July 2012 at HowlSpace website, retrieved 24 January 2014

Discography references:
Vernon Joyson: Dreams, Fantasies and Nightmares from Far Away Lands: Canadian, Australasian and Latin American Rock and Pop, 1963–75 (Borderline Books, 1999)
Rate Your Music – Normie Rowe

External links
Normie Rowe official website
Normie Rowe (entry in the Australian National Film and Sound Archive)
"Rock Snaps: The Laurie Richards Collection"  – includes several photographs of Normie taken at the height of his mid-1960s fame

1947 births
ARIA Award winners
ARIA Hall of Fame inductees
Australian male singers
Australian military personnel of the Vietnam War
Australian monarchists
Australian pop singers
Cabaret singers
Living people
Logie Award winners
People educated at Northcote High School
Singers from Melbourne
Members of the Order of Australia